Rhododendron fortunei is a rhododendron species native to China, where it grows at altitudes of .

It blooms from April to May, with trusses of 6–12 flowers, campanulate, white to pink, and fragrant.

References

External links

 "Rhododendron fortunei", Lindley, Gard. Chron. 1859: 868. 1859.
 
 
 
 
 

fortunei
Endemic flora of China